Nothing Is Impossible is a studio album by the Australian worship band Planetshakers. Planetshakers Ministries International,  Integrity Music and Columbia released the album on August 9, 2011.

Critical reception

Mike Gill, in a nine out of ten review from Cross Rhythms, says, "The album, produced by Joth Hunt, exudes the excitement and cutting edge professionalism that we have come to expect. This is a sonic feast for those with a taste for solid rock worship. The opening track "Power" is a no-nonsense energy song that demonstrates the world class quality of the rhythm section of Mark Peric (bass) and Mike Webber (drums); guest worshipper Israel Houghton pulls out all the stops on the title track; the wall of sound on the powerful "Running To You" is absolutely breathtaking though ends so suddenly you are left hanging in space waiting for more; and "Song Of Victory" is an energetic stomp with tight vocals and Gary Newman-type synthesizer work. The quieter moments work too with tasteful piano on "Come To Jesus" and the dénouement "We Cry Out" being a beautiful appeal for revival among God's people to spread to the nations of the world."

In a four-point review with twenty-five stars, Ganns Deen states, "Altogether a solid worship album whose energy and sincerity is surprising considering it is a studio album, not a live worship album. It comes highly recommended."

Russ Hutto, for The Worship Community, replies, "Overall, I really like the Nothing Is Impossible album. There is a reason that Planetshakers is one of the pioneers in fresh praise and worship these days, and they have again blazed a new trail to fresh, passionate, encouraging praise and worship."

Track listing

References

2011 albums
Planetshakers albums